The Braço Norte Direito River, or Santa Clara River, is a river of Espírito Santo state in eastern Brazil. It is  a tributary of the Itapemirim River.

The Itapemirim River is formed by the Castelo River and the Braço Norte Direito and Braço Norte Esquerdo rivers, whose sources are in the Caparaó National Park.
The  Cachoeira da Fumaça waterfall on the Braço Norte Direito River attracts thousands of visitors annually due to its great scenic beauty.

See also
List of rivers of Espírito Santo

Notes

Sources

Rivers of Espírito Santo